Edmund Wade Davis  (born December 14, 1953) is a Canadian cultural anthropologist, ethnobotanist, author, and photographer. Davis came to prominence with his 1985 best-selling book The Serpent and the Rainbow about the zombies of Haiti. He is professor of anthropology and the BC Leadership Chair in Cultures and Ecosystems at Risk at the University of British Columbia.

Early life, family, and education
Davis was born in West Vancouver, British Columbia, Canada.

He holds degrees in anthropology and biology and received his Ph.D. in ethnobotany, all from Harvard University.

In 1974, at age 20, he crossed the Darién Gap on foot in the company of the English author and amateur explorer, Sebastian Snow.

Career
Davis is an ethnographer, writer, photographer, and filmmaker, he also is a licensed river guide and has worked as park ranger and a forestry engineer.

Anthropology and ethnobotany
Mostly through the Harvard Botanical Museum, he spent more than three years in the Amazon and Andes as a plant explorer, living among fifteen indigenous groups in eight Latin American nations while making some 6,000 botanical collections. He also conducted ethnographic fieldwork among several indigenous societies of northern Canada. His work later took him to Haiti to investigate folk preparations implicated in the creation of zombies, an assignment that led to his writing Passage of Darkness (1988) and The Serpent and the Rainbow (1986), an international bestseller. The book was used loosely as the basis of a Wes Craven horror film, The Serpent and the Rainbow (1988).

Other books by Davis include Penan: Voice for the Borneo Rain Forest (1990), Shadows in the Sun (1998), Nomads of the Dawn (1995), The Clouded Leopard (1998), Rainforest (1998), Light at the Edge of the World (2001), The Lost Amazon (2004), Grand Canyon (2008), Book of Peoples of the World (ed. 2008), and One River (1996), which was nominated for the 1997 Governor General's Literary Award for nonfiction. His books have been translated into fourteen languages, including Basque, Serbian, Japanese, and Malay.

He has published 1800 popular articles on subjects ranging from Haitian vodoun, Amazonian myth and religion, the traditional use of psychotropic drugs, the ethnobotany of South American Indians, as well as, how COVID-19 has signaled the end of the American era. Davis has written for National Geographic, Newsweek, Premiere, Outside, Omni, Harpers, Fortune, Men's Journal, Condé Nast Traveler, Natural History, Scientific American, National Geographic Traveler, The New York Times, Wall Street Journal, Washington Post, The Globe and Mail, Rolling Stone, and numerous other international publications.

Davis is a Fellow of the International League of Conservation Photographers (iLCP).

Davis served as Explorer-in-Residence with the National Geographic Society from 2000 to 2013. 

Davis' 2012 book Into the Silence: The Great War, Mallory and the Conquest of Everest won the Baillie Gifford Prize (formerly the Samuel Johnson prize) for non-fiction. His account weaves together the three Everest expeditions in 1922, 1923 and 1924, set in the shadow of the Great War, by finding "a unifying thread in the person of George Mallory, the scatter-brained Adonis and Bloomsbury favourite whose fate would enthral the nation," wrote John Keay in Literary Review.

Photography
His photographs have appeared in some 20 books and more than 80 magazines, journals, and newspapers, including National Geographic, Time, GEO, People, Men's Journal, Outside, and National Geographic Adventure. They have been exhibited at the International Center of Photography (ICP), the Marsha Ralls Gallery (Washington, D.C.), the United Nations (Cultures on the Edge exhibition 2004), the Carpenter Center of Harvard University, and the Utama Center (Kuala Lumpur, Malaysia). Some of his images are part of the permanent collection of the U.S. State Department, Africa and Latin America Bureaus. Davis is the co-curator of The Lost Amazon: The Photographic Journey of Richard Evans Schultes, first exhibited at the National Museum of Natural History, Smithsonian Institution, and currently touring Latin America. A first collection of Davis's photographs, Light at the Edge of the World, appeared in 2001 published by National Geographic Books, Bloomsbury, and Douglas & McIntyre. A second collection was under contract for 2013 publication with Douglas & McIntyre as well.

Filmmaking and other media involvement
Davis was the series creator, host, and co-writer of Light at the Edge of the World, a four-hour ethnographic documentary series, shot in Rapa Nui, Tahiti, the Marquesas, Nunavut, Greenland, Nepal, and Peru, which aired in 165 countries on the National Geographic Channel and in the USA on Smithsonian Networks.

He is featured in the MacGillivray Freeman IMAX film Grand Canyon Adventure: River at Risk, released in the spring of 2008. Other television credits include the award-winning documentaries Spirit of the Mask, Cry of the Forgotten People, Forests Forever, and Earthguide, a 13-part television series on the environment that aired on the Discovery Channel in 1990. His four-hour series with National Geographic, Ancient Voices / Modern World, was shot in Australia, Mongolia, and Colombia. It has been broadcast worldwide on the National Geographic Channel as part of the second season of Light at the Edge of the World.

In 2022 Davis curated an exhibition at the Bowers Museum in Santa Ana, California that highlighted the history of expeditions to the peak of Mount Everest. The exhibition "Ascent to Glory," included photographs, films and artifacts from five expeditions from the period 1921 to 1953. The Bowers Museum presented the exhibition in partnership with London's Royal Geographical Society.

Advisory work
An honorary research associate of the Institute of Economic Botany of the New York Botanical Garden, he is a Fellow of the Linnean Society, a Fellow of the Explorer's Club, a Fellow of the Royal Geographical Society, and a Fellow of the Royal Canadian Geographical Society. Davis was a founding board member of the David Suzuki Foundation and completed a six-year term on the board of the Banff Centre, a Canadian institution for the arts. He has served on the board of directors since 2009 for the Amazon Conservation Association, whose mission is to conserve the biological diversity of the Amazon. In 2009, he delivered the CBC Massey Lectures, Canada's most prestigious public intellectual forum.

He is a member of the International Advisory Board, Hunt Consolidated, PLNG, and has also been engaged in Journey to Zero, a three-year campaign sponsored by Nissan and TBWA to support zero emission vehicles.

Criticisms of work in Haiti
In 1983, Davis first advanced his hypothesis that tetrodotoxin (TTX) poisoning could explain the existence of Haitian zombies. This idea has been controversial and his 1985 follow-up book (The Serpent and the Rainbow) elaborating upon this claim has been criticized as containing a number of scientific inaccuracies. One of these is the suggestion that Haitian witchdoctors can keep "zombies" in a state of pharmacologically induced trance for many years. As part of his Haitian investigations, Davis commissioned the exhumation of a recently buried child. (Dead human tissue is supposed to be a part of the "zombie powder" used by witchdoctors to produce zombies.) This has been criticized in the professional literature as a breach of ethics.

The strictly scientific criticism of Davis's zombie project has focused on the claims about the chemical composition of the "zombie powder". Several samples of the powder were analyzed for TTX levels by experts in 1986. They reported  that only "insignificant traces of tetrodotoxin [were found] in the samples of 'zombie powder' which were supplied for analysis by Davis" and that "it can be concluded that the widely circulated claim in the lay press to the effect that tetrodotoxin is the causal agent in the initial zombification process is without factual foundation". Davis's claims were subsequently defended by other scientists doing further analyses, and these findings were criticized in turn for poor methodology and technique by the original skeptics. Aside from the question of whether or not "zombie powder" contains significant amounts of TTX, the underlying concept of "tetrodotoxin zombification" has also been questioned more directly on a physiological basis. TTX, which blocks sodium channels on the neural membrane, produces numbness, slurred speech, and possibly, paralysis or even respiratory failure and death in severe cases. As an isolated pharmacological agent, it is not known to produce the trance-like or "mental slave" state typical of the zombies of Haitian mythology, or of Davis's descriptions. This criticism can be countered by pointing to the datura mentioned in Davis's research. In and of itself, datura can produce these trance-like symptoms, and if a part of regular meals, could cause (or contribute to) the maintained stupor. Datura ingestions may present with prolonged toxic effects lasting hours to days.

Biochemist Jessika Jake has noted that bromism also may be at play here. In his account of his release, Clairvius Narcisse reported that the master's wife fed salt to the enslaved and set them free. Administering NaCl helps the body excrete bromide, and thus is a known treatment for bromism. Symptoms of bromism include stupor, slurred speech, abnormal gait, and other symptoms described in zombie folklore (such as "behavior [that] can become violent, especially at night", skin rashes, and enlarged pupils). Further investigation into the bromide source, which may be as simple as the use of bromide salts when preparing food for the enslaved, should be addressed.

Personal life
Davis is married. He and his wife, Gail Percy, have lived in several places, sometimes with concurrent residences in Washington, D.C., Vancouver, the Stikine Valley of northern British Columbia, and Bowen Island near Vancouver. They have two adult daughters, Tara and Raina. On April 13, 2018, Davis was granted Colombian nationality and citizenship by President Juan Manuel Santos.

Awards and accolades

2002: Lowell Thomas Medal (The Explorers Club)
2002: Lannan Foundation $125,000 prize for literary non-fiction
2003: Honorary Degree (Doctorate of Sciences) from University of Victoria
2004: Honorary Member of The Explorers Club, one of twenty
2008: Honorary Degree, University of Guelph
2009: Gold Medal of The Royal Canadian Geographical Society
2009: Speaker for the Massey Lectures, for his publication, The Wayfinders 
2011: The Explorers Medal — the highest award of The Explorers Club
2010: Honorary Degree, Colorado College
2010: Honorary Doctorate of Laws, University of Northern British Columbia
2012: David Fairchild Medal for Plant Exploration, considered the most prestigious prize for botanical exploration.
2012: Samuel Johnson Prize, winner, Into the Silence
2012: Boardman Tasker Prize for Mountain Literature, shortlist, Into the Silence
2012: Governor General's Literary Award, shortlist, Into the Silence 
2012: Banff Mountain Book Festival, Mountain & Wilderness Literature, finalist, Into the Silence 
2015: Order of Canada with the grade of member
2017: Roy Chapman Andrews Society Distinguished Explorer Award
2017: Sir Christopher Ondaatje Medal for Exploration from the Royal Canadian Geographical Society

Publications

As author
 
1997 edition retitled: The Serpent and the Rainbow: A Harvard Scientist's Astonishing Journey into the Secret Societies of Haitian Voodoo, Zombies, and Magic.
 
Davis, Wade and Thom Henley (1990), Penan Voice for the Borneo Rain Forest, Western Canada Wilderness.
Davis, Wade (1991), The Art of Shamanic Healing, Cross Cultural Shamanism Network.

 (Published in Canada as The Clouded Leopard: A Book of Travels, Douglas & McIntyre, 1998.)

Davis, Wade, The Unraveling of America, Rolling Stone, August 6, 2020 - (how COVID-19 signals the end of the American era)

Photography books
Davis, Wade, Ian MacKenzie, and Shane Kennedy (1995), Nomads of the Dawn: The Penan of the Borneo Rain Forest.
Osborne, Graham (Photographs) and Wade Davis (Text) (1998), Rainforest: Ancient Realm of the Pacific Northwest White River Junction, Vermont, Chelsea Green Publishing Company.
Davis, Wade (2004), The Lost Amazon: The Photographic Journey of Richard Evans Schultes, Chronicle Books (Intro by Andrew Weil).

As editor
Davis, Wade and K. David Harrison (2008) Book of Peoples of the World: A Guide to Cultures, National Geographic, (2nd edition).

Video
Earthguide (1991). Cinetel Productions for the Discovery Channel. 13-part documentary on environmental issues. Davis was host and co-writer.
"The Spirit of the Mask" (1992). Produced by Gryphon Productions. 1992. Davis was host and co-writer. 1 hour documentary.
"Cry of the Forgotten Land" (1993). 1 hour documentary on the Moi people of West Papua, New Guinea. Davis was narrator/co-writer
"The Explorer" Life and Times (2002). Produced by the Canadian Broadcasting Corporation (CBC) DVD by Monarch Films. 1 hour biographical documentary.
"Grand Canyon: River at Risk" (2008). 3D IMAX, MacGillivray Freeman Films. Davis was principal character.
Peyote to LSD: A Psychedelic Odyssey (2008). Produced in collaboration with Gryphon Productions. Filmed on location in New Mexico, Oaxaca, and lowland Ecuador. Two-hour special for the History Channel-based Davis's books One River (1996) and The Lost Amazon (2004). DVD available, A&E Television Network. Davis was host/co-writer/co-producer.
Light at the Edge of the World: Science of the Mind (2007). Directed by Andrew Gregg, produced by Davis and Andrew Gregg for National Geographic.
The Path of the Anaconda (2019). Directed by Alessandro Ángulo Brandestini, the documentary follows Davis as he travels to Colombia with anthropologist Martín von Hildebrand following the footsteps of Richard Evans Schultes.

Media

Davis's research into "Haitian Zombies" was explored in an episode of Science Channel's Dark Matters: Twisted But True.
Davis's research into "Haitian Zombies" was mentioned in an episode of CUNY TV's Science Goes to the Movies.
Davis's research into "Haitian Zombies" was referenced in the X-Files episode "Fresh Bones," season 2, episode 15.

See also
 Richard Evans Schultes
 Timothy Plowman

Notes

References

External links

 
 
 

1953 births
Living people
Academics in Quebec
Canadian anthropologists
20th-century Canadian botanists
Harvard College alumni
Canadian emigrants to the United States
Ethnobotanists
People from West Vancouver
Royal Canadian Geographical Society fellows
Scientists from British Columbia
Academic staff of the University of British Columbia
Members of the Order of Canada
Writers from British Columbia
Harvard Graduate School of Arts and Sciences alumni
20th-century Canadian non-fiction writers
21st-century Canadian non-fiction writers
Canadian male non-fiction writers